Abdul Karim (born 1 March 2000) is a Ghanaian professional footballer who plays as midfielder for Ghanaian Premier League side Bechem United.

Career 
Karim started his career with Bechem United and he made his debut during the 2019–20 season. He made his debut in a 2–1 victory over Berekum Chelsea on 2 February 2020. On 20 February 2020, he scored his debut goal after scoring the first goal in the 2–1 victory over Liberty Professionals. He played in 6 league matches and scored 1 goal before the league was cancelled due to restrictions from the COVID-19 pandemic in Ghana.

He was named on the squad for the 2020–21 season and had his breakout season during that season.

References

External links 

 

Living people
2000 births
Association football midfielders
Ghanaian footballers
Bechem United F.C. players
Ghana Premier League players